Moonstone is a Japanese visual novel studio known for creating adult-oriented bishōjo games. The founding members of Moonstone had once been members of Circus, a similar visual novel studio. After the establishment of Moonstone, a collaboration project between Moonstone and Circus was set up for Circus' game Suika AS+, and then another collaboration project between the two companies was set up for Moonstone's game Gift. On 2009 Moonstone established the sub-brand Moonstone Cherry, which focuses on nukige titles.

Games produced

By Moonstone
Ashita Deatta Shōjo (May 30, 2003)
Imōto Watashi, Donna Koto Datte... (November 28, 2003)
Doko e Iku no, Ano Hi (June 25, 2004)
Gift (May 27, 2004)
Gift Rainbow-colored Stories (January 27, 2006)
Clear (August 24, 2007)
Clear Crystal Stories (May 3, 2008)
Maji Suki ~Marginal Skip~ (April 24, 2009)
Angel Ring (June 25, 2010)
Princess Evangile (July 28, 2011)
Princess Evangile: W Happiness (June 29, 2012)
Magical Marriage Lunatics!! (September 27, 2013)
Love Sweets (April 25, 2014)
Natsu no Iro no Nostalgia (January 30, 2015)

By Moonstone Cherry
Icha Pri! ~Ojousama to Icha Love Ecchi na Mainichi~ (December 18, 2009)
Imouto Paradise! ~Onii-chan to Go nin no Imouto no Ecchi Shimakuri na Mainichi~ (December 28, 2010)
Houkago☆Eroge Bu! ~Eroge Seisaku no Tame Onnanoko to Ecchi Shimakuri na Mainichi~ (February 25, 2012)
Imouto Paradise! 2 ~Onii-chan to Go nin no Imouto no Motto! Ecchi Shimakuri na Mainichi~ (April 18, 2013)
Demon Busters ~Ecchi na Ecchi na Demon Taiji~ (October 31, 2014)
Imouto Paradise! 3 ~Onii-chan to Go nin no Imouto no Motto! Ecchi Shimakuri na Mainichi~(January 26, 2018)

External links
Moonstone official website 

Amusement companies of Japan
Hentai companies
Video game companies of Japan
Japanese companies established in 2003
Video game companies established in 2003